The 1984–85 Virginia Tech Hokies men's basketball team represented Virginia Polytechnic Institute and State University from Blacksburg, Virginia as members of the Metro Conference during the 1984–85 season. The Hokies were led by head coach Charles Moir and played their home games at Cassell Coliseum in Blacksburg, Virginia. After finishing second in the Metro regular season standings, Virginia Tech was knocked off in the quarterfinals of the conference tournament. The Hokies still secured an at-large bid to the NCAA tournament. As No. 9 seed in the East region, the team was beaten by Temple in the opening round.

Roster

Schedule and results

|-
!colspan=9 style=| Regular Season

|-
!colspan=9 style=| Metro Tournament

|-
!colspan=9 style=| NCAA Tournament

Rankings

References

Virginia Tech Hokies men's basketball seasons
Virginia Tech
Virginia Tech
1984 in sports in Virginia
1985 in sports in Virginia